Retriggering is a tracker technique in which a sample is replayed a set number of times within a certain timeframe.

Basic theory of tracker time
Traditional music trackers cut time into "ticks" based on the system clock of the hardware the software is running on. For every tick, one event can take place. This event could be a sample playing, a volume changing, an effect taking place or a sample ceasing to play. This allows the musician to visually organize time in a gridwork of cells in which to set these events into motion, and thus decide the overall tempo of the music. This "time signature" can be altered programmatically throughout the piece of music, allowing tempo to rise, shift, swerve erratically or any combination of these as the musician sees fit.

The retrigger effect
For tracker musicians working at very slow speeds, the need to escape the confines of this time-grid is often apparent. For instance a musician might want to add a drum roll, but lack the time resolution to do so effectively. The retrigger effect allows this by calling an event that tells the software to replay the triggered sample at a set rate within the timeframe of the tick on which the event transpires. This ability to circumvent this one rigid limitation of the typical music tracker software has become a staple of the tracker scene, in some cases inspiring artist names and album titles based on the concept of retriggering.

See also
 Snare rush

Sound production
Audio trackers